Monks Lane Halt was a railway halt about  south of Hurst Green. It was on the Uckfield Branch of the Oxted Line beside Monks Lane bridge.

History
The station was opened on 1 June 1907 by the London, Brighton and South Coast Railway (LBSCR) to serve expected development nearby, at the same time as the nearby Hurst Green halt. The halt consisted of two wooden platforms with a corrugated iron shelter on each.

The station closed to passengers on 11 September 1939.  The line remains open and is today used by trains on the Uckfield branch of the Oxted line, although nothing remains of the station.

References

External links 
 Monks Lane Halt photos on derekhayward.co.uk

Former London, Brighton and South Coast Railway stations
Railway stations opened in 1907
Railway stations closed in 1939
Disused railway stations in Surrey